Yana Urqu (Quechua yana black, urqu mountain, "black mountain", also spelled Yanaorgo)  is a mountain in the Andes of Peru which reaches a height of approximately . It lies in the Junín Region, Tarma Province, Acobamba District, northeast of Acobamba.

References 

Mountains of Peru
Mountains of Junín Region